Iain Francis Lees-Galloway (born 18 September 1978), initially Iain Galloway, is a New Zealand former politician. He represented the Palmerston North electorate in Parliament for the Labour Party. He was the Minister for Workplace Relations, Immigration, and ACC. He was dismissed by Prime Minister Jacinda Ardern from Cabinet on 22 July after an affair with a staff member over a period of 12 months. He did not stand for reelection in the 2020 election.

Early life
Lees-Galloway was born on 18 September 1978 in Auckland, where he attended Kings College. He moved to Palmerston North to study at Massey University where he was president of the Massey University Students' Association in 2005. He graduated with a Bachelor of Arts from Massey in 2016.

Professional experience
Before entering Parliament Lees-Galloway worked for the New Zealand Nurses Organisation as an organiser and subsequently publicity coordinator.

Member of Parliament

Fifth National Government, 2008–2017
Lees-Galloway joined the Labour Party in 2005 and became chairman of the Palmerston North branch in the following year. He defeated the National Party candidate, Malcolm Plimmer, with a majority of 1,117 votes.

Lees-Galloway had a majority of 2,212 votes over Naylor.

During his tenure, Lees-Galloway has served as the Labour Party's spokesperson for Veteran's Affairs, Transport and, Land Information and has served associate spokesperson for Health. Prior to that, he was associate spokesperson on health (drugs and alcohol) and defence. He served as junior whip for the Labour Party from 2013 to 2014.

He has had three bills drawn from the member's ballot. In September 2010, his Smoke-free Environments (Removing Tobacco Displays) Amendment Bill was drawn from the member's ballot, attempting to ban the display of tobacco products and smoking accessories at points of sale. The bill's objective was subsequently adopted in a Government bill which came into force 23 July 2012. Lees-Galloway's Electoral (Adjustment of Thresholds) Amendment Bill was also drawn from the member's ballot in 
February 2013. It proposed amendments to the Electoral Act 1993, implementing the recommendations of the Electoral Commission with respect to the party vote threshold. In October 2013, his Land Transport (Safer Alcohol Limits for Driving) Amendment Bill, was drawn and progressed to First Reading. This bill would have lowered the allowable blood alcohol content (BAC) from 0.08g to 0.05g per 100mls of blood when driving. The Government announced their own legislation that would do the same after Lees-Galloway's bill was drawn. The legislation was passed July 2014.

As his party's spokesperson for Workplace Relations, Lees-Galloway was a leading voice alongside trade unions in the campaign to eliminate zero-hour contracts in New Zealand. In 2016, after a year and a half long campaign that involved tens of thousands of New Zealanders, industrial action by union members, parliamentary negotiations, agreements were made with the National government. Lees-Galloway submitted an amendment to the Employment Standards Legislation Bill that addressed the issue and was approved overwhelmingly. The bill unanimously passed in parliament on 11 March 2016 and took effect April 2016. The legislation is thought to be one of the first laws in the developed world to end the use of deals criticised as exploitative. Lees-Galloway has declared the reforms "a win for working people" of New Zealand.

Sixth Labour Government, 2017–2020
He was designated as Minister of Immigration by the Labour Party caucus following Labour's formation of a coalition government with New Zealand First and the Greens.

Because Lees-Galloway had both Workplace Relations and Immigration, both areas where Labour and New Zealand First had great differences of opinion, he had a tough job within the coalition. One minister said that he was “at the front line of the differences between Labour and NZ First”, while a Labour source said, "Every single immigration issue was absolute torture". Tracey Martin, a NZ First MP, said that her party's relationship with Lees-Galloway was “incredibly fraught". A source from NZ First described Lees-Galloway as "arrogant", and a Labour cabinet minister said that he "was not very good at hiding the dismay on his face. Even when he was silent, you could see how pissed off he was."

On 20 July 2018, Lees-Galloway in his capacity as Immigration Minister granted visas for the Canadian alt right activists Lauren Southern and Stefan Molyneux to visit New Zealand for a speaking tour in August 2018. Mayor of Auckland Phil Goff had denied them access to Auckland Council facilities on the grounds that they were there to stir ethnic and political tensions. While Lees-Galloway described Southern and Molyneux's views as counter to the "kind and tolerant values" of the vast majority of New Zealanders, he cleared their visas on the grounds that they had fulfilled immigration character requirements including not having been convicted of a crime or previously barred from Australia and the United Kingdom.

In October and November 2018, Lees-Galloway was criticised by the opposition National Party over his decision to grant residency to the convicted Czech drug smuggler Karel Sroubek, who had a lengthy criminal record in both the Czech Republic and New Zealand. The case also attracted considerable media interest in New Zealand and led the Czech government to seek Sroubek's extradition. In December 2018, Lees-Galloway attributed his decision to Immigration New Zealand's failure to provide information on Sroubek's criminal activities in the Czech Republic.

Dismissal
On 22 July 2020 Lees-Galloway was dismissed from his immigration, workplace relations and ACC ministerial portfolios by Prime Minister Jacinda Ardern after admitting an inappropriate but consensual relationship with a person working in one of his agencies. Prime Minister Ardern dismissed Lees-Galloway after receiving information from Opposition Leader Judith Collins, stating that she had lost confidence in him for "improperly using his position of power." Additionally, there was an official probe into his spending, though this did not find anything inappropriate.

Lees-Galloway issued a statement admitting that he had acted "completely inappropriately" in his position and could not continue as a minister. He also apologised to the Prime Minister and his family "for letting them down". Lees-Galloway kept a generally low profile after the demotion, apart from going to Parliament to give his valedictory speech.

Lees-Galloway did not stand at the 2020 election. Tangi Utikere, the deputy mayor of Palmerston North, replaced Lees-Galloway as the Labour Party candidate for the Palmerston North electorate, and won the electorate.

On 29 September 2020, Lees-Galloway was granted retention of the title "The Honourable" for life, in recognition of his term as a member of the Executive Council.

Career after Parliament 
After leaving Parliament, Lees-Galloway took up a temporary role as lead organiser for the New Zealand Nurses Organisation. He also started a business venture called Here’s Good, which would provide information about and promotion for businesses and aid in donating to good causes.

Personal life
Lees-Galloway is married to kindergarten teacher Claire; the couple have three children.

References

External links

 Official website
 Page  on New Zealand Parliament website
 Page on New Zealand Labour Party's website

|-

|-

|-

|-

1978 births
People educated at King's College, Auckland
Living people
New Zealand Labour Party MPs
Members of the New Zealand House of Representatives
New Zealand MPs for North Island electorates
Association of Community Access Broadcasters
21st-century New Zealand politicians
Candidates in the 2017 New Zealand general election
Members of the Cabinet of New Zealand